Every Home Should Have One is the fourth studio album by American R&B/jazz singer Patti Austin, released on September 28, 1981, by Qwest Records. The album includes the number-one hit duet with James Ingram, "Baby Come to Me", and the title track, "Every Home Should Have One", which peaked at number 62 on the Billboard Hot 100.   She also scored with "Do You Love Me?", a #24 R&B & #1 Dance Chart hit.

The vinyl/cassette mix of the album differs from the CD mix. With the CD version some tracks are remixed, e.g. track 4 gains overdubs, and/or edited, e.g. track 5 loses the fade-in intro.

Track listing

Personnel
 Patti Austin – lead and backing vocals (all tracks), vocal arrangements (4, 7-9), BGV arrangements (5)
 James Ingram – backing vocals (1, 5), lead vocals (5), BGV arrangements (5)
 Greg Phillinganes – keyboards (1-3, 5, 6, 9), synthesizers (1-7, 10), synthesizer solo (2, 6)
 Michael Boddicker – synthesizers (1, 2, 5-10), rhythm and synthesizer arrangements (9)
 David Foster – synthesizers (1, 5, 6)
 Rod Temperton – rhythm arrangements (1, 2, 5-7), synthesizer arrangements (1, 2, 5, 6), vocal arrangements (1-6, 8), synthesizers (2, 5, 10)
 Richard Tee – acoustic piano (3), keyboards (4), Fender Rhodes (7, 8, 10)
 Bob James – synthesizers (3, 4, 8, 10), acoustic piano (10)
 Steve Lukather – guitar (1, 3-6, 9), acoustic guitar (2), electric guitar (2)
 Eric Gale – guitar (4, 7, 8, 10)
 Louis Johnson – bass (1, 6)
 Eddie Watkins, Jr. – bass (3, 5, 9)
 Anthony Jackson – bass (4, 7, 8, 10)
 John Robinson – drums (1-3, 5, 6, 9)
 Chris Parker – drums (4, 7, 8, 10)
 Paulinho da Costa – percussion (1-3, 5, 6, 9)
 Ralph MacDonald – percussion (4, 7, 8)
 Ernie Watts – tenor saxophone solo (4, 9)
 Quincy Jones – rhythm arrangements (3, 4, 7, 8), vocal arrangements (3, 4, 7), synthesizer arrangements (3, 7)
 Jerry Hey – synthesizer arrangements (3, 7)

Production
 Quincy Jones – producer 
 Bruce Swedien – recording engineer, mixing
 Ed Cherney – assistant engineer
 Lincoln Clapp – assistant engineer 
 Matt Forger – assistant engineer
 Brian Reeves – assistant engineer 
 Bernie Grundman – mastering at A&M Studios (Hollywood, California).
 Roland Young – art direction, cover design concept 
 Ed Eckstein – cover design concept 
 Image Works – illustration 
 Raul Vega – photography

Charts

Weekly charts

Year-end charts

Singles

References

1981 albums
Patti Austin albums
Albums produced by Quincy Jones
Qwest Records albums